Kumbadjena toolbrunupensis is a species of velvet worm in the family Peripatopsidae. This species has 15 pairs of legs. The type locality is in Western Australia.

References 

Onychophorans of Australasia
Onychophoran species
Animals described in 2018